Rizza is an Italian surname that may refer to
Audrey La Rizza (born 1981), French judoka
Gilda dalla Rizza (1892–1975), Italian soprano 
Giovanni Battista Rizza (1924–2018), Italian mathematician
Giuseppe Rizza (1987–2020), Italian football defender 
Manfredi Rizza (born 1991), Italian canoeist
Margaret Rizza (born 1929), English composer, primarily of church music

Italian-language surnames